Sherman Todd (April 1, 1904 - June 10, 1979) was an American film editor and producer. He was nominated for two Academy Awards in the category Best Film Editing for the films The Long Voyage Home and For Whom the Bell Tolls. Todd died in June 1979 in Laguna Beach, California, at the age of 75. His body was cremated.

Selected filmography 
 The Long Voyage Home (1940)
 For Whom the Bell Tolls (1943; co-nominated with John F. Link Sr.)

References

External links 

1904 births
1979 deaths
People from Buffalo, Wyoming
American film editors
American television editors